Lawrence William Wogan (18 September 1890 – August 1979) was a rugby union player who represented Australia.

Wogan, a centre, was born in Hokitika and claimed a total of 22 international rugby caps for Australia.

See also
 1912 Australia rugby union tour of Canada and the U.S.

References

Australian rugby union players
Australia international rugby union players
1890 births
1979 deaths
People from Hokitika
Australian people of New Zealand descent
Rugby union players from West Coast, New Zealand
Rugby union centres